Live from the Metropolitan Opera (or: Live from the Met) was an American television program that presented performances of complete operas from the Metropolitan Opera in New York City on the Public Broadcasting Service (PBS) network.

The program began in 1977 and was telecast live for its first few seasons.  The first telecast, La Bohème, featured Luciano Pavarotti as Rodolfo and Renata Scotto as Mimì, with James Levine conducting; all three were interviewed during the intermission.  Celebrated singers featured on Live from the Met included Plácido Domingo, Luciano Pavarotti, Beverly Sills, Samuel Ramey, Renée Fleming, Joan Sutherland, Marilyn Horne, Renata Scotto, Leontyne Price, and Sherrill Milnes.  During the intermissions of its live broadcasts, the program offered interviews and other features on opera topics; these segments were often up to a half-hour in length.

Live from the Met functioned as a supplement to the company's regular Saturday Metropolitan Opera radio broadcasts. During its first fifteen years the program was frequently simulcast, enabling some audiences to hear the opera in stereo via radio as well. Hosts included Tony Randall, Speight Jenkins, Alexander Scourby, and Garrick Utley. The announcer was Peter Allen.

In 1988 the program title was changed to The Metropolitan Opera Presents to reflect the fact that the performances were now taped prior to broadcast.

The Metropolitan Opera Presents was replaced on PBS in 2007 by Great Performances at the Met. Operas aired in this series are repeats of the performances presented live on video in movie theaters in the Met's "Live in HD" series. Not all PBS affiliate stations may carry the program.

References

External links

Metropolitan Opera
PBS original programming
1977 American television series debuts
2003 American television series endings
1970s American music television series
1980s American music television series
1990s American music television series
2000s American music television series
American live television series
Television shows filmed in New York City